Tajna marenda is the first studio album of Montenegrin hip hop group, Monteniggers, which was released in 1996.

Songs 

The album contains 10 songs. The track listings are as follows:

1. Pašji pas  
2. Ducka diesel  
3. Pop  
4. Psycho  
5. Đekna  
6. Mala plava  
7. Bljump  
8. Lorry  
9. Mladi pistolero  
10. Pismo

External links
Tajna marenda at Discogs

1996 albums